WNSP (105.5 FM, "Sports Radio 105.5") is a radio station licensed to serve Bay Minette, Alabama, United States.  The station, founded in 1964, is currently owned by Dot Com Plus, LLC.  WNSP and sister station WZEW broadcast from the former Smith Bakery building in Mobile, Alabama.  WNSP's transmitter is near Bay Minette.

Programming
Since September 11, 1993, WNSP has broadcast a sports talk format to the greater Mobile metropolitan area. In addition to its daily lineup of local programs covering the Southeastern Conference, golf, hunting, fishing, NASCAR, and other regional sports, the station features select programming from ESPN Radio.  WNSP is the flagship station of the University of South Alabama men's basketball radio network.  The station is the Mobile affiliate of the New Orleans Saints radio network and both the Auburn Tigers football and Auburn Tigers basketball radio networks. Beginning with the 2009 college football season, WNSP became the affiliate for the University of South Alabama Jaguars football program.

On February 16, 2009, the station began airing the regionally syndicated The Paul Finebaum Radio Network on weekday afternoons, replacing a locally-hosted program. The station cited budgetary reasons for the change in lineup.

History
This station began regular broadcast operations on October 1, 1964, as WBCA-FM. Broadcasting with 3,000 watts of effective radiated power, the Faulkner Radio, Inc.-owned station was the FM sister station to WBCA (1110 AM).  As with the AM station, the WBCA callsign was said to stand for "Wonderful Baldwin County Alabama".  James H. Faulkner, owner of Faulkner Radio, also owned The Baldwin Times newspaper and had served as the mayor of Bay Minnette from 1941 to 1943.

In 1967, the station raised its antenna to 104 meters (340 feet), lowered its effective radiated power to 2,300 watts, and changed its call letters to WWSM. Programmed separately from its country music formatted AM sister station since its launch in 1964, WWSM played a soul music format for most of the 1970s. However, by 1979, the station had adopted a Top 40 format and was simulcasting as much as 60% of the AM station's programming.

In August 1985, the Faulkner family agreed to transfer control of licensee Faulkner Radio Inc. to Faulkner University.  The deal was approved by the FCC on October 3, 1985, and the transaction was consummated on January 10, 1986.  In March 1986, Faulkner Radio Inc. agreed to formally transfer the broadcast license for WWSM to Faulkner University.  This transfer was approved by the FCC on April 2, 1986, and the transaction was consummated on August 4, 1986.

In March 1987, Faulkner University reached an agreement to transfer the WWSM license to a new company called Faulkner-Phillips Media Inc.  The deal was approved by the FCC on April 15, 1987, and the transaction was consummated on May 22, 1987. In 1987, the station acquired the intellectual property from Mobile's 96.1 FM. Consequently, the station's call sign was changed to WLPR and the format was changed to beautiful music. The station was assigned the WMMV call letters by the Federal Communications Commission on September 1, 1989.  The station was assigned new call letters WYMZ on March 9, 1992, but this was a short-term change as the station made another application to the FCC and was granted WNWT on October 12, 1992.  These too would prove short-lived as the station was assigned the current WNSP callsign less than a year later on August 31, 1993.

The new callsign was chosen to accompany a new sports talk format which launched on September 11, 1993.  WNSP claims to be the first sports talk station in the United States to operate on the FM band.  Operation of the station was taken over by Capitol Broadcasting in 1995 as part of a local marketing agreement.  Capitol Broadcasting was bought out and absorbed by Clear Channel Communications in mid-1997.  With Clear Channel unwilling to continue the LMA, WNSP's owners reached an agreement in May 1998 to sell this station to Dot Com Plus, Inc.  The deal was approved by the FCC on July 6, 1998, and the transaction was consummated on July 9, 1998.

Personalities
Lee Shirvanian - Morning Sportscenter, South Alabama Jaguars athletics, The Joey Jones Show, Gumbo Express
Mark Heim - Morning Sportscenter
Creg Stevenson - Afternoon Sports Drive, South Alabama Jaguars athletics, The Tide & Tiger Report, Talkin' Football
Randy Kennedy - Afternoon Sports Drive, The Tide & Tiger Report, Talkin' Football, Prep Sports Report
Tommy Praytor - Inside Alabama Racing
Randy Burgan - Sidelines
Max Howell - Sidelines, Prep Sports Report

Notable former on-air personalities include Mobile Press-Register sports reporter Neal McCready. McCready said he lost his job co-hosting the weekday "Afternoon Sports Drive" show in part due to complaints by advertisers over his negative coverage of University of Alabama football and current Sirius XM College Sports Nation host Taylor Zarzour.

References

External links

NSP
ESPN Radio stations
Radio stations established in 1964
1964 establishments in Alabama
Mass media in Baldwin County, Alabama